Kitka Women's Vocal Ensemble is an all-female professional vocal ensemble based in Oakland, California and focused on Eastern European women’s vocal traditions. It was founded in 1979 as an offshoot of the Westwind International Folk Ensemble. Under the direction of Bon Singer from 1981 to 1996, Kitka became a professional ensemble specializing in the techniques of traditional and contemporary Balkan, Slavic, and Caucasian vocal styling. Under the co-direction of Shira Cion, Janet Kutulas and Juliana Graffagna since 1997, Kitka has been recognized by the National Endowment for the Arts, Chorus America, and the American Choral Directors’ Association. The group takes its name from the word for "bouquet" in Bulgarian and Macedonian.

Discography

References

External Sources
 

American folk musical groups
Organizations based in Oakland, California
Musical groups from Oakland, California